The 2016 Portugal wildfires are a series of wildfires that burned across mainland Portugal and the Madeira archipelago in the north Atlantic Ocean during August 2016 that prompted the evacuation of more than one thousand people and destroyed at least 37 homes near Funchal on Madeira island. Flights were also disrupted at Cristiano Ronaldo International Airport due to high levels of smoke.

At least seven major fires were burning out of control in the north of Portugal on August 9, according to officials, the fire of Arouca and S.Pedro do Sul was the biggest. 

The authorities say around 3,000 firefighters are trying to extinguish hundreds of forest fires across the country.

An emergency was declared in Portugal's northern Norte Region as firefighters battled numerous wildfires.

Fire in Madeira 

On 9 August 2016 a fire, allegedly by arson, started at the S. Roque parish in Madeira that quickly spread throughout the region of Southern Madeira and to its capital Funchal. 
Though still burning in several fronts, the fire was, according to Madeira's regional president Miguel Albuquerque, "under control". The statement was later qualified.

Four deaths are attributed to the wildfire as well as a thousand displaced people.
The five-star hotel "Choupana Hills" was also gutted by the flames.
Three suspects of arson are currently detained and one of them is currently in pre-trial detention.

Reactions 
The hashtag #PrayForPortugal trended on social media in response to the wildfires.

International support 
The South Yorkshire Fire and Rescue service in the United Kingdom sent a large amount of specialist equipment to volunteer colleagues in Portugal after an appeal for equipment. The shipment included hose-reel fittings, ropes and tools.
The European Union is helping Portugal combat the wildfires. Italy and Spain have sent three Canadair airplanes. Morocco is also sending two Canadair airplanes.
East Timor is donating €2M to Portugal to help fight the fires and to help the victims.
Russia is also expected to send air help due to a bilateral agreement between the two countries.
Cristiano Ronaldo also donated £100,000 to his hometown of Funchal.

See also
List of wildfires
August 2003 wildfires
2017 Portugal wildfires

References

2016 in Portugal
August 2016 events in Europe
2016 wildfires
Wildfires in Portugal